Punch-Drunk Love is the 2002 soundtrack album featuring music composed by Jon Brion for the film of the same name. The album includes the song "He Needs Me" from the 1980 Robert Altman movie Popeye. The soundtrack received an enthusiastic review from classical music critic Greg Sandow.

Brion provides main vocals (in addition to playing most of the instruments) in the song "Here We Go".

Track listing
All tracks composed by Jon Brion except where otherwise noted.
"Overture" – 2:09
"Tabla" – 2:59
"Punch-Drunk Melody" – 1:43
"Hands and Feet" – 3:42
"Le Petit Chateau" – 1:36
"Alleyway" – 0:55
"Punchy Tack Piano" – 1:25
"He Needs Me" – 3:31
original composition by Harry Nilsson, original vocals by Shelley Duvall, remix and additional composition by Jon Brion and Jonathan Karp
"Waikiki" – 3:56
performed by Ladies K, original composition by Andy Cummings
"Moana Chimes" – 3:03
original composition by Johnny Noble and M.K. Moke
"Hospital" – 1:21
"Danny (Lonely Blue Boy)" – 2:13
performed by Conway Twitty, original composition by Ben Weisman and Fred Wise
"Healthy Choice" – 2:10
"Third Floor Hallway" – 3:23
"Blossoms & Blood" – 2:05
"Here We Go" – 4:47
"He Really Needs Me" – 3:10

References

Romance film soundtracks
Jon Brion albums
Albums produced by Jon Brion
2002 soundtrack albums
Nonesuch Records soundtracks
Comedy film soundtracks